The Knee Diaries is a documentary series that focuses on various cases of muscular-skeleton ailments, joint injuries and arthritis. Created by Alimorad Farshchian and  produced by CaribeVision, the series is hosted by Andy Guze and Kimberly Ann Jones.

External links
 4rfv.co.uk: News about "The Knee Diaries"

2007 American television series debuts
2000s American documentary television series
Arthritis